Samsø Højskole was a folk high school on the island of Samsø in Denmark. It was founded in 1984. The courses were focused on nature, photography and art. Since 2002 courses were focused on obesity, weight loss, exercise, and healthy eating. Courses were offered twice a year, in September and January.

The school was forced to close in 2012, due to economical hardships.

References

External links
 Samsø Højskole's official website

Schools in Denmark
Obesity
Buildings and structures in Samsø Municipality
Educational institutions established in 1984
Educational institutions disestablished in 2012
Folk high schools in Denmark
Defunct schools in Denmark
1984 establishments in Denmark